The Eclipse Tour was a concert tour by American rock band Journey. It was in support of the group's fourteenth studio album Eclipse. The album is Arnel Pineda's second since joining the band in 2007. Special guests on the 2011 tour include Foreigner and Night Ranger for most of the North American dates, Styx for the European dates, and Sweet for South American dates. The tour was the sixth top-grossing concert tour from July 23, 2011 to September 23, 2011 bringing in over $21 million and selling over 900,000 tickets. For the 2012 U.S. tour, special guests were Pat Benatar and Loverboy, and the guests for the 2013 tour were Deep Purple for the Australian dates, and Whitesnake for the European dates. For the 2014–2015 tour, the Steve Miller Band co-headlined. The 2016 tour saw the band play with The Doobie Brothers, as well as signal the return of "classic" drummer Steve Smith after longtime drummer Deen Castronovo was fired from the group. The 2017 tour had Asia co-headline, and also included the band's induction and performance at their induction into the Rock and Roll Hall of Fame. This tour is also the longest-running in the entire history of the band.

Set list – leg 1
"Separate Ways (Worlds Apart)"
"Edge of The Moment"
"Only the Young"
"Ask the Lonely"
"Never Walk Away"
"Send Her My Love"
"Resonate"
"Stone in Love"
"Keep on Running"
"City of Hope"
"Lights"
"Open Arms"
"Chain of Love"
"Mother, Father"
"Wheel in the Sky"
"Human Feel"
"Be Good to Yourself"
"Faithfully"
"Don't Stop Believin'"
"Any Way You Want It"
Encore:
"Escape"
"Lovin', Touchin', Squeezin'"

Set list – leg 2
"Majestic"
"Never Walk Away"
"Ask the Lonely"
"After All These Years" 
"Chain Reaction"
"La Do Da"
"Still They Ride" 
"Only the Young"
"Faith In The Heartland"
"Faithfully"
"Stone in Love"
"Send Her My Love"
"Where Did I Lose Your Love"
"Lights"
"City Of Hope"
"Wheel in the Sky"
"Open Arms"
"Separate Ways"
"Be Good To Yourself'"
"Don't Stop Believin'"
"Any Way You Want It"
Encore:
"Escape"
"Lovin', Touchin', Squeezin'"

Concert gross
2011 
 The Eclipse Tour concert tour was the 18th highest-grossing concert tour of 2011 bringing in $39,069,939. 
 According to Pollstar it was the highest-grossing concert from July 23, 2011 to September 23, 2011 bringing in over $21 million.
 The tour had 17 sellouts and averaged over $600,000 per show.

2012 
 Journey was #36 on Pollstars Top 200 North American Tours, grossing 25.8 million during the 2012 The Eclipse Tour concert tour. 
 The tour grossed over $469,000 each night, with an average of 7,745 in attendance per show. 
 The total ticket sales were in excess of $425,000

Personnel
Neal Schon – lead guitar, backing vocals
Ross Valory – bass, backing vocals
Jonathan Cain – keyboards, rhythm guitar, backing vocals
Deen Castronovo – drums, percussion, backing vocals (2011–2015)
Steve Smith – drums, percussion (2016–2017)
Arnel Pineda – lead vocals
with:

Travis Thibodaux – keyboards, backing vocals (2016−2017)

Special guests
Europe – Foreigner, Styx, Saga, Kansas, Night Ranger, and FM
North America – Foreigner, Night Ranger,
Central America – Night Ranger
Puerto Rico – Night Ranger
South America – The Sweet
 2012 North America Leg  – Pat Benatar, Loverboy
 2013 Australia Tour – Deep Purple Co-headliner
 2013 Europe Tour – Whitesnake Co-headliner
 2013 North America- Rascal Flatts, The Band Perry & Cassadee Pope  (Hershey & Atlantic City Only)
 2014–2015 North America – Steve Miller Band, Tower of Power, Neal "Vortex" Schon
 2016  North America – The Doobie Brothers, Dave Mason
 2017  North America – Asia
Omar Hakim- filling in for Deen Castronovo for the shows in other countries and 2015 North American dates

Tour dates

Box office score data
2012

2016

2017

Cancelled shows

References

2011 concert tours
2012 concert tours
2013 concert tours
2014 concert tours
2015 concert tours
2016 concert tours
2017 concert tours
Journey (band) concert tours